Khnata Bennouna ( born in Fez, Morocco from a family of four children, 1940) is a Moroccan author of novels and short stories.

Bennouna is regarded as a politically inclined writer.  Her books frequently deal with the Palestinian subject both from a political and humanitarian point of view. Bennouna worked as a principal of Wullada high-school at Casablanca.

Life 
Khnata Bennouna is the first Moroccan woman to write, at a time when only men were taking over this activity. She is one of the first Moroccan women to challenge traditions and customs after refusing to marry at a very young age and after rebelling against her father’s wishes.

She was also the first woman to write a novel. This was in 1969 and the preface is none other than the leader of the national movement Allal El Fassi.

Bibliography
Liyasqet Assamt (Down with Silence!) (1967)
Annar wa Al-'ikhtiyar (Fire and Choice)  (1969) - won the Morocco Literary Prize in 1971
Assawt wa Assurah (Sound and Image)  (1975)
Al-A'asifah (The Tempest)  (1979)
Al-Ghad wa Al-Ghadab (Tomorrow and Wrath) (1981)
Assamt Annatiq (Talking Silence)  (1987)

References

1940 births
Living people
Moroccan women novelists
Moroccan novelists
People from Fez, Morocco
20th-century Moroccan women writers
21st-century Moroccan women writers
20th-century Moroccan writers
21st-century Moroccan writers
Women school principals and headteachers